The year 1502 in science and technology included many events, some of which are listed below.

Exploration
 January 1 – Portuguese explorers, led by Pedro Álvares Cabral, sail into Guanabara Bay, Brazil, mistaking it for the mouth of a river, which they name Rio de Janeiro.
 May 11 – Christopher Columbus leaves Cadiz, Spain for his fourth and final voyage to the New World.
 May 21 – Portuguese navigator João da Nova discovers the uninhabited island of Saint Helena.
 August 14 – Columbus lands at Trujillo and names the country 'Honduras'.
 September 18 – Columbus lands in Costa Rica.
 Amerigo Vespucci, on his return to Lisbon from a voyage to the New World, writes a letter, Mundus Novus, to Lorenzo de' Medici indicating that South America must be an independent continent.
 The Cantino planisphere is the first known world map showing Portuguese discoveries.

Technology
 In Germany, Peter Henlein of Nuremberg uses iron parts and coiled springs to build a portable timepiece, the first "Nuremberg Eg".

Births
 Pedro Nunes, Portuguese mathematician (died 1578)
 approx. date – Jorge Reinel, Portuguese cartographer (d. after 1572)

References

 
16th century in science
1500s in science